28th Native Infantry may refer to several regiments in the British Indian Army:
the 28th Bengal Native Infantry (later the 28th Punjabis)
the 28th Bombay Native Infantry (later the 128th Pioneers)
the 28th Madras Native Infantry (later the 88th Carnatic Infantry)

British Indian Army infantry regiments